Ageneotettix brevipennis, the short-wing big-headed grasshopper, is a species of slant-faced grasshopper in the family Acrididae. It is found in Central America, North America, and Mexico.

References

Further reading

 

Gomphocerinae
Articles created by Qbugbot
Insects described in 1904